The Messerschmitt Bf 165 was a German long-range bomber project. There is very little info published about the Bf 165, but it is known that wind tunnel testing of the aircraft began in 1937. A full-scale mockup of the aircraft was constructed for display to the Reichsführer in 1937. The Bf 165 was to have a top speed of 600 km/h and a range of 6000 km with a 1000 kg bombload.

References

1930s German bomber aircraft
Bf 165
Four-engined tractor aircraft
Four-engined piston aircraft